Phaedra is a 1962 American-Greek drama film directed by Jules Dassin as a vehicle for his partner (and future wife) Melina Mercouri, after her worldwide hit Never on Sunday.

The film was the fourth collaboration between Dassin and Mercouri, who took the title role. Greek writer Margarita Liberaki adapted Euripides' Hippolytus into a melodrama concerning the rich society of ship owners and their families, but still containing some of the tragic elements of the ancient drama. The film is set in Paris, London, and the Greek island of Hydra.

Plot 
Phaedra, second wife of shipping tycoon Thanos (Raf Vallone), falls in love with her husband's son from his first marriage, Alexis (Anthony Perkins). The love is doomed from the very beginning but they are unable to control their feelings.

Cast 
Melina Mercouri as Phaedra
Anthony Perkins as Alexis
Raf Vallone as Thanos
Élisabeth Ercy as Ercy
Georges Sari as Ariadne
Andreas Philippides as Andreas
Olympia Papadouka as Anna
Stelios Vokovich as Stavros
Nikos Tzogias as Felere (as Nicos Tzoyas)
Depy Martini as Heleni
Alexis Pezas as Dimitris
Kostas Baladimas as Dimos (as Dimos Baladinas)
Marc Bohan as himself (uncredited)
Jules Dassin as Christos (uncredited)

Production 
Phaedra was filmed in Greece, France, and Great Britain. The production company Jorilie Productions is only credited by the American copyright source and the films status as a French co-production is unconfirmed.

The movie was released in 1962.  It was a hit in Europe but a box-office failure in the USA. Although Mercouri and Perkins became friends during the filming, the magazines, and especially Esquire magazine, attacked the film, because of Perkins's vulnerability. Phaedra was one of several films that teamed Perkins with notable older female stars.

Soundtrack 
The music was composed by Mikis Theodorakis. In the soundtrack, Melina Mercouri sang two songs. The first one was written by Nikos Gatsos, a major Greek poet, and was sung by Mercouri and Perkins after their love scene in Paris. The other one was heard in the film as the main love theme. Both of the songs are popular in Greece and they have been performed by hundreds of singers and actors.

The toccata from Johann Sebastian Bach's Toccata and Fugue for organ in F major, BWV 540 was used prominently in the film.

DVD
Phaedra was released to DVD by MGM Home Entertainment on June 6, 2011, as a Region 1 fullscreen DVD-on-demand disc via MGM's Limited Edition Collection available through Amazon.

See also
 List of American films of 1962

References

External links

1962 films
1962 drama films
American drama films
American multilingual films
Greek drama films
Greek multilingual films
English-language Greek films
Films directed by Jules Dassin
Films scored by Mikis Theodorakis
Films based on works by Euripides
Modern adaptations of works by Euripides
Works based on Hippolytus (play)
Films shot in Hydra
Films shot in France
Films set in Greece
Phaedra
1960s American films